Christopher Thomas Pierce (born 21 December 1942) is a retired British rower who competed in the 1972 Summer Olympics.

Rowing career
Pierce won the coxed fours with Alan Almand, Hugh Matheson, Dick Findlay and Patrick Sweeney, rowing for a Tideway Scullers and Leander composite, at the inaugural 1972 National Rowing Championships. The winning crew were then selected to represent Great Britain at the 1972 Olympics, Rooney Massara replaced Findlay in the men's coxed four event where the crew finished in tenth place after being knocked out in the semi finals.

References

1942 births
Living people
British male rowers
Olympic rowers of Great Britain
Rowers at the 1972 Summer Olympics
Place of birth missing (living people)